Tāreha Te Moananui (died 19 December 1880) was a principal chief of the Ngāti Kahungunu iwi, and a Māori member of Parliament in New Zealand from 1868 to 1870.

Born between 1800 and 1810, Tāreha was the son of Oneone and Hāmene. He added Te Moananui to his name following the death of Ngāti Kahungunu leader Kurupō Te Moananui in 1861.

Tāreha was one of four Māori elected in 1868 for the new Māori electorates in the New Zealand Parliament, and he was the first of the four to speak in Parliament. He represented the electorate of Eastern Maori from 1868 to 1870, when he retired.

He died on 19 December 1880, and his tangi and funeral took place at Waiohiki, near Taradale. He had two surviving children, sons Te Roera Tāreha (1850s–1941) and Kurupō Tāreha (1871–1938).

References

1800s births
1880 deaths
New Zealand MPs for Māori electorates
Members of the New Zealand House of Representatives
Ngāti Kahungunu people
People from the Hawke's Bay Region
19th-century New Zealand politicians